The City of Manningham is a local government area in Victoria, Australia in the north-eastern suburbs of Melbourne and is divided into 12 suburbs, with the largest being Doncaster and Doncaster East. It comprises an area of 113 square kilometres and had a population of 125,508 in June 2018.

The district spans a roughly east–west direction along the southern banks of the Yarra River and across the undulating valleys of the Koonung, Ruffey and Mullum Mullum Creeks, alternating from typical low density suburban housing in the west to remnant bushland, within a green wedge, in the east. As such, the district encompasses the transition between the built and natural environments in Melbourne's east and promotes itself as a "balance of city and country".

Formerly the City of Doncaster & Templestowe, the district is situated in the Wurundjeri nation's territory. Most of the first European settlers to the area were orchardists, arriving through the 1850s. Gold was first discovered in Victoria around the same time at Andersons Creek, in Warrandyte, however, the district saw varied growth as periods of low density suburban development occurred sporadically throughout the mid-late 20th century.

History

The Manningham municipality was created on 15 December 1994, as part of a general restructure of Melbourne's local government boundaries. The new municipality contains the former City of Doncaster & Templestowe, but with part of Ringwood North ceded to the new City of Maroondah and Wonga Park, annexed from the former Shire of Lillydale.

The name Bulleen, a nearby suburb, was proposed for the new municipality, as it was the name of the shire predating the City of Doncaster and Templestowe. However, modern residents believed the name was too localised, so the name of one of the major roads was adopted. The origin of Manningham Road comes from the region of Bradford, West Yorkshire, England. Residents' requests for the City to be named after Indigenous Australian names local to the area such as Mullum Mullum or Koonung were rejected.

Geography

The main watercourses that border or flow through the City of Manningham include;

 Yarra River
 Mullum Mullum Creek
 Koonung Creek
 Ruffey Creek
Anderson's Creek
Hopping Creek
Jumping Creek
Skipping Creek

Structure

Federal electorate
The Federal electorate of Menzies covers much of the City of Manningham. It has been held by the Federal Liberal Party since 1984.

State electorates
The City of Manningham encompasses the two Victorian state electorates of Bulleen and Warrandyte, both of which been held predominantly by the Liberal Party.

Wards and councillors

Manningham was divided into four wards electing two councillors each until 2008.  

From 2008 to 2020, Manningham has been divided into three wards, with three councillors elected for each ward. Following reforms to the Local Government Act in 2020, Manningham is divided into 9 wards, each electing one Councillor. Councillors are elected by the community for a four-year term following an election.  

The council, as of November 2020, is:

Past councillors 

1. Katerina Karanikolopoulos

CB denotes councillors elected via countback.

2. Jessica Villarreal 3. Jim Grivokostopoulos 4. Mike Zafiropoulos

Townships and localities
The 2021 census, the city had a population of 124,700 up from 116,255 in the 2016 census

^ - Territory divided with another LGA

Parklands

Covering 70 per cent of the municipality and ranging from large natural areas to intimate pocket parks, these open spaces provide a variety of unstructured play opportunities for children and families. Some of the major parks include;

Warrandyte State Park – Warrandyte and Wonga Park
Westerfolds Park – Templestowe
Candlebark Park – Templestowe
Tikalara Park – Templestowe
Ruffey Lake Park – Doncaster and Templestowe
Currawong Bush Park – Warrandyte
Birrarung Park – Templestowe Lower and Bulleen
Buck Reserve – Donvale
The 100 Acres – Park Orchards
Mullum Mullum Creek Linear Park – Doncaster East & Donvale

Education
Primary Schools – Public (14)
 Andersons Creek Primary School, Warrandyte
 Warrandyte Primary School, Warrandyte
 Templestowe Heights Primary School, Templestowe Lower
 Templestowe Park Primary School, Templestowe
 Templestowe Valley Primary School, Templestowe
 Tang Tang Heights Secondary School, Templestowe
Serpell Primary School, Templestowe
 Birralee Primary School, Doncaster
 Doncaster Primary School, Doncaster
 Doncaster Gardens Primary School, Doncaster East
 Milgate Primary School, Doncaster East
 Donburn Primary School, Doncaster East
 Beverley Hills Primary School, Doncaster East
 Donvale Primary School, Donvale
 Park Orchards Primary School, Park Orchards

Primary Schools – Private (9)
 St Clement of Rome Catholic Primary School, Bulleen
 St Gregory the Great Catholic Primary School, Doncaster
 Ss Peter & Paul's Catholic Primary School, Doncaster East
 Carey Baptist Grammar School, Donvale
  Our Lady of the Pines Catholic Primary School, Donvale
 St Anne's Catholic Primary School, Park Orchards
 St Charles Borromeo Catholic Primary School, Templestowe
 St Kevin's Catholic Primary School, Templestowe

Secondary Schools – Public (4)
 Doncaster Secondary College, Doncaster
 East Doncaster Secondary College, Doncaster East
 Templestowe College, Templestowe Lower
 Warrandyte High School, Warrandyte

Secondary Schools – Private (2)
 Marcellin College, Bulleen
 Whitefriars College

Other (2)
 Bulleen Heights School, Bulleen
 Donvale Christian College 

Libraries (4)

All libraries in the Manningham area are operated by the Whitehorse Manningham Regional Library Corporation.

Manningham Libraries include:

 Doncaster Library – MC Square, 687 Doncaster Rd, Doncaster, VIC 3108
 The Pines Library – The Pines Shopping Centre, Cnr Blackburn and Reynolds Road, Doncaster East, VIC 3109
 Warrandyte Library – 168 Yarra St, Warrandyte VIC 3113  
 Bulleen Library – Bulleen Plaza, 79–109 Manningham Road, Bulleen, VIC 3105

Transport

Manningham is the only area in metropolitan Melbourne without a train line or tram route and therefore the area is heavily reliant on private cars. A Doncaster railway line had been planned for many decades; however the land was sold off in the 1980s. Residents have long campaigned for extension of the route 48 tram along Doncaster Road to Doncaster, Doncaster East or Donvale, although this is heavily supported by Local Governments, the issue has been consistently avoided by State Government.

There are increased bus services to cope with the demand for public transport, including four radial SmartBus routes, and two exclusive Manningham Mover circular routes. Most routes are operated by Kinetic Melbourne, which has a depot in Doncaster East, near the intersection of Blackburn and Doncaster Roads.

Major roadways
  Andersons Creek Road (State Route 13)
  Blackburn Road (State Route 13)
  Bulleen Road (State Route 52)
  Croydon Road (State Route 7)
  Doncaster Road (State Route 36 / State Route 40)
  Eastern Freeway (M3)
 Elgar Road
 High Street
  Fitzsimons Lane (State Route 47)
  Foote Street (State Route 42 / State Route 52)
 King Street
  Jumping Creek Road (State Route 42)
  Manningham Road (State Route 40)
  Mitcham Road (State Route 36 / State Route 40)
 Northern Route:
  Reynolds Road (State Route 52)
 Tindals Road
 Falconer Road
 Stintons Road
 Park Road
  Springvale Road (State Route 40 / State Route 52)
  Templestowe Road (State Route 52)
  Thompsons Road (State Route 42)
  Tram Road (State Route 47)
 Warrandyte Road:
  Heidelberg-Warrandyte Road (State Route 13)
  Warrandyte-Ringwood Road (State Route 9 / State Route 42)
  Wetherby Road (State Route 23)
  Williamsons Road (State Route 47)

Notable residents
 Charles "Bud" Tingwell (died 2009)
 Karl von Möller – Australian Cinematographer, Director
 Alisa Camplin – Aerial skier, Olympic gold medallist
 Michele Timms – Basketballer, Olympic silver medallist
 Stephen Mayne – Journalist, Councillor for Heide Ward from 2008 to 2011
 Jade Rawlings – Former AFL player
 Mark "Jacko" Jackson – AFL Footballer and Actor
 Greg Evans – Australian television presenter
 Kim Crow, Olympic rower
 Scott Martin, an Australian shot putter, who is best known for appearing on Commonwealth Bank TV advertisements, which aired during the 2006 Commonwealth Games.
 Mark Wilson – Ran a dance studio on Thompsons Road in Templestowe until it was burnt down in 2008.
 Roy Robbins-Browne – Professor Roy Robins-Browne was appointed an Officer of the Order (AO) “For distinguished service to education and research in the field of microbiology and immunology and to professional groups” on 26 January, as announced in the Australia Day 2020 Honours List

See also
 List of Melbourne suburbs

References

External links
 

 Official website
Public Transport Victoria local public transport map
Link to Land Victoria interactive maps

Local government areas of Melbourne
Greater Melbourne (region)